Sandis is a Latvian masculine given name which may refer to:

Sandis Buškevics (born 1977), Latvian basketball player
Sandis Ģirģens (born 1980), Latvian politician
Sandis Ozoliņš (born 1972), Latvian hockey player, formerly in the National Hockey League
Sandis Prūsis (born 1965), Latvian bobsledder
Sandis Smons (born 1999), Latvian ice hockey player
Sandis Valters (born 1978), Latvian basketball player

See also
Sandys (surname)
Sandi (disambiguation)

References

Latvian masculine given names